The Minister of Employment is one of the Finnish Government's ministerial positions. Along with the Minister of Economic Affairs, the Minister of Employment is located at the Ministry of Economic Affairs and Employment.

List of Ministers of Labor and Employment

References 

Employment
Ministers of Labour of Finland